Atmospheric correction is the process of removing the scattering and absorption effects of the atmosphere on the reflectance values of images taken by satellite or airborne sensors. Atmospheric effects in optical remote sensing are significant and complex, dramatically altering the spectral nature of the radiation reaching the remote sensor. The atmosphere both absorbs and scatters various wavelengths of the visible spectrum which must pass through the atmosphere twice, once from the sun to the object and then again as it travels back up the image sensor. These distortions are corrected using various approaches and techniques, as described below.

Examples of Atmospheric Correction Methods

See also 
 Adaptive optics

References

External links
 Google books result
 Google books result

Photographic techniques
Satellite imagery
Aerial photography